Leonardo Fabricio 'Léo' Soares da Costa (born March 3, 1986) is a Brazilian footballer who plays for Portuguesa Santista as an attacking midfielder.

Club career
Born in São José dos Campos, São Paulo, Léo Costa graduated with Santo André, being promoted to the main squad in 2007. In 2008, he was loaned to São Bernardo, and was subsequently released by his parent club in December of that year.

In July 2009, after a short stint at Paulista, Léo Costa moved abroad for the first time in his career, joining Czech side Brno. He returned to his homeland in the following year, signing for União São João.

In August 2010 Léo Costa moved to Linense, appearing with the club in Copa Paulista and Campeonato Paulista. He later played for clubs mainly in his native state, representing Itumbiara, São Bernardo, Vila Nova, Rio Branco, Guarani and Rio Claro; with the latter he was the top scorer of 2014 Campeonato Paulista, scoring nine goals.

On 28 April 2014 Léo Costa signed for Série A's Vitória. He made his debut in the competition on 11 May, coming on as a second half substitute in a 1–1 away draw against fierce rivals Bahia.

On 16 September, after appearing in only five matches, Léo Costa rescinded his link with Leão, and joined Portuguesa three days later.

References

External links

Léo Costa at playmakerstats.com (English version of ogol.com.br)

Uruguayo Souza y brasileño Costa refuerzan al Oriente Petrolero de Azkargorta, wradio.com.co, 6 January 2016

1986 births
Living people
People from São José dos Campos
Brazilian footballers
Brazilian expatriate footballers
Association football midfielders
Campeonato Brasileiro Série A players
Campeonato Brasileiro Série B players
Campeonato Brasileiro Série C players
Campeonato Brasileiro Série D players
Czech First League players
Indian Super League players
Esporte Clube Santo André players
São Bernardo Futebol Clube players
Paulista Futebol Clube players
União São João Esporte Clube players
Clube Atlético Linense players
Itumbiara Esporte Clube players
Vila Nova Futebol Clube players
Rio Branco Esporte Clube players
Guarani FC players
Rio Claro Futebol Clube players
Esporte Clube Vitória players
Associação Portuguesa de Desportos players
Associação Atlética Ponte Preta players
FC Zbrojovka Brno players
Santa Cruz Futebol Clube players
Mumbai City FC players
Esporte Clube Pelotas players
Figueirense FC players
Associação Atlética Portuguesa (Santos) players
Expatriate footballers in the Czech Republic
Expatriate footballers in India
Brazilian expatriate sportspeople in the Czech Republic
Brazilian expatriate sportspeople in India
Footballers from São Paulo (state)